Matti Helminen (born 14 August 1975) is a Finnish racing cyclist. He won the Finnish National Time Trial Championships six times between 2003 and 2012, and finished in third place in the Finnish National Road Race Championships in 2008, 2009 and 2015.

Helminen tested positive for Probenecid at the 2012 Tour de Luxembourg and was handed a two-years suspension for doping. He appealed against this decision to the Court of Arbitration for Sport.

Major results
Source: 

2001
 National Road Championships
3rd Time trial
5th Road race
2002
 3rd Time trial, National Road Championships
2003
 National Road Championships
1st  Time trial
4th Road race
2004
 5th Road race, National Road Championships
 9th Overall Triptyque Ardennais
2005
 3rd Time trial, National Road Championships
 4th Omloop van de Vlaamse Scheldeboorden
2006
 1st  Time trial, National Road Championships
 1st Chrono Champenois
 3rd Chrono des Nations
2007
 1st  Time trial, National Road Championships
 4th Grote Prijs Jef Scherens
 7th Chrono des Nations
 9th Druivenkoers Overijse
2008
 National Road Championships
1st  Time trial
3rd Road race
 3rd Chrono Champenois
2009
 National Road Championships
2nd Time trial
3rd Road race
 9th Chrono Champenois
2010
 National Road Championships
1st  Time trial
5th Road race
 2nd Chrono Champenois
 8th Duo Normand (with Jarmo Rissanen)
2011
 2nd Time trial, National Road Championships
2012
 National Road Championships
1st  Time trial
4th Road race
2015
 National Road Championships
2nd Time trial
3rd Road race
2016
 4th Time trial, National Road Championships
2017
 2nd Time trial, National Road Championships
2019
 2nd Time trial, National Road Championships

References

External links

1975 births
Living people
Finnish male cyclists
People from Kotka
Sportspeople from Kymenlaakso